Personalities and Things That Go Bump in the Night is a set of miniatures published by Ral Partha.

Contents
Personalities and Things That Go Bump in the Night is a line of 25mm scale fantasy miniatures that were designed by Tom Meier.

Reception
Spalding Boldrick reviewed Personalities and Things That Go Bump in the Night in The Space Gamer No. 46. Boldrick commented that "The extensive and ever-expanding series has for some time represented just about the best available in FRP miniatures."

Personalities & Things That Go Bump In The Night was awarded the Origins Award for "Best Fantasy or Science Fiction Figure Series of 1982".

References

See also
List of lines of miniatures

Miniature figures
Origins Award winners